The Sympathizer is the 2015 debut novel by Vietnamese-American professor Viet Thanh Nguyen. It is a best-selling novel and recipient of the 2016 Pulitzer Prize for Fiction. The novel received generally positive acclaim from critics, and it was named a New York Times Editor's Choice.

The novel incorporates elements from a number of different novel genres: immigrant, mystery, political, metafiction, dark comedic, historical, spy, and war. The story depicts the anonymous narrator, a North Vietnamese mole in the South Vietnamese army, who stays embedded in a South Vietnamese community in exile in the United States. While in the United States, the narrator describes being an expatriate and a cultural advisor on the filming of an American film, closely resembling Platoon and Apocalypse Now, before returning to Vietnam as part of a guerrilla raid against the communists.

The dual identity of the narrator, as a mole and immigrant, and the Americanization of the Vietnam War in international literature are central themes in the novel. The novel was published 40 years to the month after the fall of Saigon, which is the initial scene of the book.

A sequel, titled The Committed, was published on March 2, 2021.

Plot 
Set as the flashback in a coerced confession of a political prisoner, the book tells the story of the South Vietnamese Government in 1975 and subsequent events in American exile in Los Angeles, through the eyes of a half-Vietnamese, half-French undercover communist agent. The spy remains unnamed throughout the novel from the fall of Saigon, to refugee camps and relocation in Los Angeles, to his time as a film consultant in the Philippines, and finally to his return and subsequent imprisonment in Vietnam.

The narrator lives in a series of dualities, at times contradictions: he is of mixed blood descent (Vietnamese mother, and French Catholic priest father), raised in Vietnam but attended college in the U.S., and a North Vietnamese mole yet a friend to South Vietnamese military officials and soldiers and a United States CIA agent. During the imminent fall of Saigon, he, as an aide-de-camp, arranges for a last minute flight as part of Operation Frequent Wind, to secure the safety of himself, his best friend Bon, and the General he advises. While they are being evacuated, the group is fired upon while boarding; during the escape, Bon's wife and child are killed along with many others.

In Los Angeles, the General and his former officers weaken quickly, disillusioned by a foreign culture and their rapid decline in status. The General attempts to reclaim some semblance of honor by opening his own business, a liquor store. The continuous emasculation and dehumanization within American society prompts the General to draft plans for assembling an army of South Vietnamese expatriates to return as rebels to Vietnam. While participating in the expatriate unit, the narrator takes a clerical position at Occidental College, begins having an affair with Ms. Mori, his Japanese-American colleague, and then the General's eldest daughter, Lana. While living in the United States, the narrator sends letters in invisible ink to Man, a North Vietnamese revolutionary and handler, providing intelligence about the General's attempts at raising a commando army.

When he receives an offer to consult for a Hollywood film on the Vietnam War called The Hamlet, he sees it as an opportunity to show multiple sides of the War and to give the Vietnamese a voice in its historical portrayal. However, working on set in the Philippines, he not only fails to complicate the misleading, romantically American representation of the war, but almost dies when explosives detonate long before they should. There is skepticism as to whether the explosion was a mistake since the director greatly dislikes the narrator.

After he recovers, against Man's insistence that he stay in the U.S. and continue his work as a mole, the narrator decides to accompany the exiled troops back into Vietnam. Before he returns, he executes a left-leaning Vietnamese newspaper editor, "Sonny", who he learns had an affair with Ms. Mori while the narrator was in the Philippines. During his mission in Vietnam, he manages to barely save Bon's life. However, it is to no heroic avail as they are captured and imprisoned.

The encampment is where the protagonist writes his confession, a plea for absolution addressed to the commandant who is directed by the commissar. However, rather than writing what his communist comrades wish to hear, the protagonist writes a complex and nuanced reflection of the events that have led him to his imprisonment. He refuses to show only one side, he leaves nothing out (even his painful memories of a childhood without a father or of his first experience masturbating), and he sympathizes with the many perspectives of a complicated conflict that has divided a nation. While he still considers himself a communist and revolutionary, he acknowledges his friendships with those who are supposedly his enemy and he understands all soldiers as honorably fighting for their home. When his confession drafts are rejected, he is finally brought before the commissar.

The commissar, the man with no face, turns out to be his direct superior Man. Yet, this does not stop Man from subjecting him to torture as part of his reeducation. First, he must admit his crime of being complicit in the torturing and raping of a female communist agent. Then he must realize that he took part, albeit unconsciously, in the murder of his father. Lastly, he must learn Man's final lesson that a revolution fought for independence and freedom could make those things worth less than nothing, that nothingness itself was more precious than independence and freedom. The novel ends with the narrator among a crowd of boat people at sea.

Style 
Almost every review comments on the most distinctive stylistic feature: the anonymous narrator who provides continuous commentary. The narrator has an "acrobatic ability" that guides the reader through the contradictions of the war and American identity. The first person narration derives from the frame context for the book: a confession by the narrator to communist captors trying to make him account for his exile. The communist captors force him to write and rewrite the narrative, in an attempt to correct his ideological lens on America and the South Vietnamese enemies.

Many critiques compare the narrator's style to other authors, typically American authors. Randy Boyagoda, writing for The Guardian, describes the initial passage of the novel as a "showy riff on Ralph Ellison's Invisible Man". For Boyagoda, the anonymity and doubled life reflection of the narrator closely parallel the African American narrator of Invisible Man'''s commentary from the perspective of concealment. Ron Charles describes the narrative voice as close to both "Roth-inspired comic scene[s] of self-abuse" and "gorgeous Whitmanian catalogue of suffering".

 Themes 
Most reviews of the novel describe it as a literary response to the typically American-centric worldview of works like Apocalypse Now and Platoon. In particular, the section of the novel where the narrator advises on The Hamlet helps critically examine this worldview. Ron Charles describes this section as "As funny as it is tragic", able to "carry the whole novel". The New York Times' book review describes the war as a "literary war", and says that Nguyen's The Sympathizer is "giving voice to the previously voiceless [Vietnamese perspective] while it compels the rest of us to look at the events of 40 years ago in a new light". In part, the novel is a response to Nguyen's own admiration of, but difficult relationship with, works like Platoon, Apocalypse Now, and Rambo and the slaughter of Vietnamese in the films.

The narrator's duality of caste, education, and loyalties drive much of the novels' activities. At first this duality is the strength of the novel's narrator, providing deft critique and investigation into the contradictions of social situations, but eventually, in the last, this duality "becomes an absurdist tour de force that might have been written by a Kafka or Genet".

 Reception The New York Times Book Review praised the novel for its place in the broader Vietnam War literature, and for its treatment of dualities in a way that "compares favorably with masters like Conrad, Greene and le Carré".  Writing for The Washington Post, Ron Charles called the novel "surely a new classic of war fiction" which is "startlingly insightful and perilously candid". For Charles, it is less the particulars of the thematic explosion of the response to the Vietnam war that makes the novel relevant, but rather how "Nguyen plumbs the loneliness of human life, the costs of fraternity and the tragic limits of our sympathy". Randy Boyagoda, writing for The Guardian, describes it as a "bold, artful and globally minded reimagining of the Vietnam war and its interwoven private and public legacies". A Vietnamese reviewer noted that, finally, Americans have a chance to gain a new perspective on the war, one that is in contrast to the one provided by Hollywood myth-makers.

The main critique from reviewers is, at times, the overwritten description in the novel. Though generally supportive of the novel, Boyagoda describes this overwriting: "the Captain's grandstanding against east/west stereotypes and against the putative ills of the US and Catholicism clogs his monologue because it does little more than advance an equally hackneyed set of complaints and rebuttals. Nguyen's own academic background also seeps in, inspiring didactic language."

Awards
 Winner, 2016 Pulitzer Prize for Fiction
 Winner, 2016 Dayton Literary Peace Prize
 Winner, 2016 Carnegie Medal for Excellence in Fiction
 Winner, 2016 Edgar Award for Best First Novel
 Winner, 2015 Center for Fiction First Novel Prize
 Winner, 2015 Asian/Pacific American Award for Literature
 Finalist, 2016 PEN/Faulkner Award for Fiction
 Shortlisted, 2017 International Dublin Literary Award

 Television adaptation 
In April 2021, A24 and Rhombus Media acquired the rights to the novel to adapt it into a television series. In July 2021, it was announced that HBO had given the production a series order. The series will be produced by A24 with Robert Downey Jr. as co-star and executive producer, Park Chan-wook as director and Don McKellar as co-showrunner.
In November 2022, Hoa Xuande, Fred Nguyen Khan, Toan Le, Vy Le, Alan Trong, Sandra Oh, Kiều Chinh, Nguyễn Cao Kỳ Duyên joined the cast. In January 2023, it was announced that Marc Munden and Fernando Meirelles would direct several episodes of the series and also Duy Nguyen, Kayli Tran and VyVy Nguyen added to the cast.

See also
 Phạm Xuân Ẩn

References

 Further reading 
 Hai-Dang Phan and Hao Phan (2018) Two Readings of Two Books by Viet Thanh Nguyen. Journal of Vietnamese Studies'', Vol. 13, No. 1 (WINTER 2018), pp. 121-136.

Vietnamese PEN Club
2015 American novels
Novels by Viet Thanh Nguyen
Novels set in Los Angeles
Pulitzer Prize for Fiction-winning works
American spy novels
Novels set during the Vietnam War
Vietnamese-American novels
English-language novels
Grove Press books
2015 debut novels
American historical novels
American novels adapted into television shows